S100 calcium-binding protein A12 (S100A12) is a protein that in humans is encoded by the S100A12 gene. Human S100A12, also known as calgranulin C, was first described in 1995.

The protein encoded by this gene is a member of the S100 family of proteins containing 2 EF-hand calcium-binding motifs.

Function 

Generally, S100A12 has a significant anti-infectious and antibacterial role that is related to its ability to uptake ions. For example, it inhibits the spread and virulence of H. pylori.

Tissue distribution 

Neutrophils and monocytes / macrophages are important source of S100A12 in the cell although some epithelial cells and dendritic cells are capable of its secretion. Some tissues are rich in these cells, and so in this protein. These include the spleen or lungs. It occurs intracellularly but is also produced into the extracellular environment where it occurs as a homodimer or hexamer.

Clinical significance 

Its presence is associated with cardiovascular and kidney diseases. Like other S100 proteins, S100A12 signals through the RAGE receptor and TLR. In general, this signalling leads to cytokine production, chemotaxis and increased oxidative stress. In endothelial cells, this signaling leads to activation of NFκB, under which the production of adhesion molecules such as ICAMs, VCAM or selectins is increased. This protein is proposed to be involved in specific calcium-dependent signal transduction pathways and its regulatory effect on cytoskeletal components may modulate various neutrophil activities.

Cascades that are triggered by interaction of S100A12 with RAGE may play an important role in renal failure in hemodialysis patients. The relationship between S100A12 and renal dialysis mortality rates has been repeatedly reported. S100A12 may play a role in monitoring SLE patients as a marker of kidney damage in glomerulonephritis. It is also associated with gastrointestinal diseases. In inflammatory bowel diseases, it significantly correlates with disease activity and, together with other 100S family proteins, can predict disease relapse.

References

Further reading 

 
 
 
 
 
 
 
 
 
 
 
 
 
 
 
 
 

S100 proteins